Claude Edwin Davenport (May 28, 1898 – June 13, 1976), nicknamed "Big Dave", was a Major League Baseball pitcher who played in  with the New York Giants. He batted and threw right-handed.

He was born in Runge, Texas, and died in Corpus Christi, Texas.

He was the brother of former major leaguer Dave Davenport.

External links

1898 births
1976 deaths
Major League Baseball pitchers
Baseball players from Texas
New York Giants (NL) players
People from Karnes County, Texas
Minor league baseball managers
San Antonio Bears players
Dallas Steers players
Beaumont Exporters players
St. Joseph Saints players
Minneapolis Millers (baseball) players
Houston Buffaloes players
Des Moines Demons players
Mission Reds players